The Iad (also: Iada) is a left tributary of the river Crișul Repede in Romania. It discharges into the Crișul Repede near Bulz.

Tributaries

The following rivers are tributaries to the Iad:

Left: Leșu
Right: Cârligate, Valea Runcului, Guga, Valea Lupului, Dașor, Sărăcel

References

Rivers of Romania
Rivers of Bihor County